Coodanup is a south-eastern suburb of Mandurah, Western Australia. Its local government area is the City of Mandurah.

History
The name "Coodanup" is of unknown origin, although the WA gazetteer states that in 1836, Lieutenant Henry Bunbury noted "Colanup" was the local Noongar name for the mouth of the Serpentine River.

Geography
Coodanup is bounded by the Serpentine River to the east, Harvey Estuary to the south, Pinjarra Road to the north and Mandurah Bypass and Wanjeep Street to the west.

References

Suburbs of Mandurah